Durham police may refer to:

 Durham Police Department (North Carolina)
 Durham Regional Police Service in Durham County, Ontario, Canada
 Durham Constabulary in County Durham, England